Metarctia paremphares is a moth of the subfamily Arctiinae. It was described by William Jacob Holland in 1893. It is found in Angola, the Democratic Republic of the Congo, Gabon, Ghana, Kenya, Rwanda, Tanzania, Zimbabwe and possibly South Africa.

References

 

Metarctia
Moths described in 1893